Route 121 is a state highway in southern Connecticut running from U.S. Route 1 in Milford to Route 34 near the Orange-Derby line.

Route description

Route 121 begins at an intersection with US 1 in Milford and heads north, passing underneath I-95 without a junction  later, then enters the town of Orange after another . In Orange, Route 121 continues north, intersecting about half a mile later with Derby-Milford Road, a direct route into Derby, and the Wilbur Cross Parkway (Route 15) at Exit 56 after another . The road continues past the Wilbur Cross Parkway for another  until the intersection with Route 34 (Derby Turnpike) in the northern edge of Orange, where Route 121 ends. In Milford, Route 121 is known as North Street, while in Orange, it is known as Grassy Hill Road.

History
In the 1920s, the current alignment of Route 121 was known as State Highway 195 and was one of the routes between Milford and Derby. In the 1932 state highway renumbering, old Highway 195 became Route 121. In 1941, Route 121 was shortened when US 1 was relocated from Cherry Street to its current route at the Boston Post Road. North Street south of current Route 1 is still signed as the route for the Milford train station.

Junction list

References

External links

121
Transportation in New Haven County, Connecticut
Milford, Connecticut
Orange, Connecticut